The Wack Pack is the name given to an assortment of personalities heard throughout the history of The Howard Stern Show. As a parody of the Rat Pack or Brat Pack, Stern biographer Richard Mintzer has labeled them a key part of the show. Members tend to be unusual in some way: being blatantly racist, mentally disabled, having a comical appearance, voice or ability, or some combination thereof. As of 2023, twenty-two living individuals are designated "Wack Packers" (along with a number of deceased). Not every regular guest on or caller to the show is considered a member, nor are any of the show's staff members; Stern has stated that Wack Packers are not defined by having any disability or peculiarity, but by their inability to understand why they are funny.

Through their appearances on the radio show, some Wack Packers have gained notoriety for personal appearances around the country and occasionally, played roles in films and television programs.

History
In the 1993 book Private Parts, Howard Stern lists early members of the Wack Pack, including Irene the Leather Weather Lady, who is essentially the first Wack Packer, having met Stern in May 1980 when he was broadcasting from WWWW in Detroit, Michigan. Upon the introduction of Fred the Elephant Boy on the radio show on November 28, 1988, among a collection of others, Stern began calling the group of show personalities the "Wack Pack" on July 6, 1990, as documented in Stern's The History of Howard Stern radio series. Since moving to Sirius XM Radio, Stern has offered some members of the Wack Pack their own shows.

Official list

On February 24, 2015, Stern and crew voted on an "official" list of Wack Pack members.

Living Wack Packers
The following individuals are official Howard Stern Show Wack Pack members: 
Angry Alice (formerly Crazy Alice)
Asian Pete
Ass Napkin Ed
Beetlejuice, named "Greatest Wack Packer of All Time" (Lester Green)
Bigfoot (Mark Shaw, Jr., not to be confused with actor Matthew McGrory, who previously had the name "Bigfoot" on the show.)
Gary the Conqueror (Gary Loudermilk, previously known as Gary the Retard)
High Pitch Erik (Erik Bleaman)
High Register Sean (named in 2019)
Jeff the Drunk (Jeff Curro, also known as Jeff the Bore)
Jeff the Vomit Guy (Jeff Levy)
John the Stutterer (not to be confused with former staff member and former Tonight Show announcer Stuttering John Melendez)
Lenny Dykstra
Mark the Bagger (Mark Rothenberger) 
Medicated Pete (Pete McHeffey)
Melrose Larry Green
Miss Howard Stern (Andrea Ownbey)
Monotone Matt
Siobhan the Transsexual
Sour Shoes (Michael DelCampo)
Tan Mom (Patricia Krentcil)
Underdog Lady (Suzanne Muldowney)
Wendy the Slow Adult (formerly Wendy the Retard)

Former Wack Packers
Hanzi (Imran Khan) (permanently banned from show, April 2016)

"Not Wack Pack Material"
The following individuals were at one time considered Wack Pack members.  However, since 2015, they were excluded by Stern and his staff from the Wack Pack for reasons including their ability to hold a job and function in society, while still having a funny or unusual personality. 
Angry Black
Big Black
Bobo (Steve Bowe).  Bobo lost his name temporarily and was known as Steve from Florida. In June 2017, Bobo endured a humiliating act to win his name back on the show.
Captain Janks (Tom Cipriano)
Daniel Carver
Eddie the Produce Guy
Elegant Elliot Offen (permanently banned from show, 2006)
Gay Ramón
Ham Hands Bill
Hate Man
Hate Woman
The Iron Sheik (Hossein Khosrow Ali Vaziri)
The Kielbasa Queen (Denise Miller)
King of All Blacks (Lawrence Coward)
Mariann from Brooklyn (Mariann Tepedino), considered the #1 super fan and den mother to the Wack Pack.
Mick the Nerd (currently considered a candidate)
Speech Impediment Man
Vin the Retard
Wheelchair Steve
Wood Yi
Yucko the Clown (Roger Black)

Deceased Wack Packers

The following individuals were determined to be Wack Pack members either by Stern and his staff or by other sources prior to their death: 
Bigfoot (Matthew McGrory)
Blue Iris
Celestine
Cliff Palate (Lynn Zimmermann, also known as Lispy Lynn to North Texas listeners)
Debbie the Space Alien (Debbie Tay, née Roach)
Fran the Singing Psychic (Frances Baskerville)
Fred the Elephant Boy (Fred Schreiber)
George "Crackhead Bob" Harvey
Eric the Actor (formerly Eric the Midget)
Fruity Nutcake (formerly Rappin' Granny)
Hank the Angry Drunken Dwarf (Henry J. Nasiff, Jr.)
Joe Cancer
Joey Boots (Joseph Bassolino)
Kenneth Keith Kallenbach
Marfan Mike (Mike Diamond)
Nicole Bass
Riley Martin
Ted the Janitor (Ted Green)
Evil David Letterman (Dave Van Dam, also known as Evil Dave)

References

External links
Wack Pack Profiles on HowardStern.com

Howard Stern